Indian Village State Preserve, or the Wittrock Indian Village State Preserve, is a state archaeological preserve near Sutherland, Iowa.  The  property preserves the Indian Village Site (13OB4), a prehistoric fortified village of the Mill Creek culture.  It was declared a National Historic Landmark in 1964, and made a state preserve in 1968.  It is located east of Sutherland, south of 455th Street and west of Yellow Avenue.  Access to the preserve requires crossing private land.

The site is located on a terrace overlooking Waterman Creek. It has yielded evidence of occupation for a roughly 300-year period around 1200 CE. The site was completely surrounded by a wooden stockade, probably for protection against other Native Americans. Each lodge had a fireplace and a storage pit.

The site was acquired by the state in 1937, and has been the subject of several excavations by professional archaeologists.  It was first excavated by the state in 1965, at which time elements of the stockade and the character of the housing was identified.   The site is subject to erosion, which the state has taken steps to mitigate by the installation of gabions on the creek bank.  Materials from the site are archived at the University of Wisconsin in Madison, and at the state archaeological office.  The state has installed a partial recreation of a stockade, to give an impression of what life might have been like in the village.

See also
List of National Historic Landmarks in Iowa
National Register of Historic Places listings in O'Brien County, Iowa
List of Iowa State Preserves

References

National Historic Landmarks in Iowa
Geography of O'Brien County, Iowa
Archaeological sites on the National Register of Historic Places in Iowa
National Register of Historic Places in O'Brien County, Iowa